Oak Grove School is a private, co-educational, day and boarding school in Ojai, California, United States. It was established in 1975 by Jiddu Krishnamurti and is part of the Krishnamurti Foundation of America.

References

External links 
 
 Oak Grove School at Krishnamurti Foundation of America

Jiddu Krishnamurti schools
Ojai, California
High schools in Ventura County, California
Private K-12 schools in California
Boarding schools in California
Educational institutions established in 1975
1975 establishments in California